The Duke of Westminster's Medal for Military Literature was awarded by the Royal United Services Institute for Defence and Security Studies, (the RUSI), Whitehall, London. Awarded annually from 1997 to 2016, the Medal was given to honour a living author who has published a notable original contribution to the fields of defences studies and international security affairs. This award has been superseded by the Duke of Wellington Medal for Military History as of 2018.

The Duke of Westminster's Medallists

 1997: Andrew Gordon: The Rules of the Game: Jutland and the British Naval Command
 1998: Hew Strachan: The Politics of the British Army
 1999: John Keegan: The First World War
 2000: Michael Hickey: The Korean War: The West confronts Communism 
 2001: Norman Friedman: The Fifty-Year War: Conflict and Strategy in the Cold War
 2002: Sir Percy Cradock: Know Your Enemy: How the Joint Intelligence Committee Saw the World 
 2003: Marrack Goulding: Peacemonger
 2004: Gerard DeGroot: The Bomb, a Life 
 2005: Nicholas Rodger: The Command of the Ocean: A Naval History of Britain 1649–1815
 2006: R. J. B. Knight: The Pursuit of Victory: The Life and Achievement of Horatio Nelson
 2007: Aleksandr Fursenko and Timothy Naftali: Khrushchev's Cold War: The Inside Story of an American Adversary 
 2008: Chris Bellamy: Absolute War: Soviet Russia in the Second World War 
 2009: Sir Lawrence Freedman: A Choice of Enemies: America Confronts the Middle East
 2010: Antony Beevor: D-Day: The Battle for Normandy
 2011: Sir Rodric Braithwaite: Afgantsy: The Russians in Afghanistan, 1979–89
 2012: Sir Max Hastings: All Hell Let Loose: The World at War 1939–1945
 2013: Anne Applebaum: Iron Curtain: The Crushing of Eastern Europe 1944–56
 2014: Rana Mitter China’s War with Japan 1937-1945: The Struggle for Survival
 2015: Lord Peter Hennessy and James Jinks: The Silent Deep: The Royal Navy Submarine Service since 1945

References

External links
RUSI website: Duke of Westminster's Medal for Military Literature. 

English literary awards
Awards established in 1997
Military literary awards